The Damoure-Fabre DFL-6 was a French ultralight monoplane built in the 1960s for amateur construction.

Variants
Data from:Les Avions Francais de 1944 a 1964
DFL-5A derivative of the earlier DFL-6; One built (DFL-5 No.01 F-PKMV).
DFL-6Light aircraft powered by a Continental C90. Two built, (No01 F-WJCQ and No02 F-PPPG)

Specifications

References

Homebuilt aircraft
Single-engined tractor aircraft
Low-wing aircraft
Aircraft first flown in 1960